Pelangi Hotel is a hotel in Tanjung Pinang, Bintan, Indonesia. The Pelangi restaurant serves Chinese and Indonesian cuisine.

External links
Official site

Hotels in Bintan Island